The 2019 Grote Prijs Jef Scherens was the 53rd edition of the Grote Prijs Jef Scherens road cycling one day race in and around Leuven. It was held on 16 August 2018 as a 1.1 categorised race and was part of the 2018 UCI Europe Tour and the 2018 Belgian Road Cycling Cup.

The race ended in a bunch sprint of roughly 50 riders, with Niccolò Bonifazio taking the victory ahead of Hugo Hofstetter. Timothy Dupont took third place, thereby managing to end on the podium for the third year running, after also becoming third in the 2018 Grote Prijs Jef Scherens and winning the 2017 edition. Defending champion Jasper Stuyven did not take part this year.

Teams
Twenty-three teams were invited to take part in the race. These included eleven UCI Professional Continental teams and twelve UCI Continental teams.

Result

References

External links

Grote Prijs Jef Scherens
2019 UCI Europe Tour
2019 in Belgian sport